Hleb Saladukha (born 27 December 1994) is a Belarusian sprint canoeist. He participated at the 2018 ICF Canoe Sprint World Championships.

References

1994 births
Belarusian male canoeists
Living people
ICF Canoe Sprint World Championships medalists in Canadian